Scadoxus multiflorus (formerly Haemanthus multiflorus) is a bulbous plant native to most of sub-Saharan Africa from Senegal to Somalia to South Africa. It is also native to Arabian Peninsula (Saudi Arabia, Yemen, Oman) and to the Seychelles. It is naturalized in Mexico and in the Chagos Archipelago.It is also found in Indian peninsula. It is grown as an ornamental plant for its brilliantly coloured flowers, either in containers or in the ground in where the climate is suitable. There are three recognized subspecies. Strongly toxic like other Scadoxus species, it has been used as a component of arrow poisons and fishing poisons, as well as in traditional medicine. Common names, some of which are used for other species, include blood lily, ball lily, fireball lily, blood flower, Katherine-wheel, oxtongue lily, poison root and powderpuff lily.

Description

Scadoxus multiflorus grows from a "rhizomatous bulb", i.e. a bulb which also produces rhizomes (modified underground stems). The leaves and flower may appear together or the leaves may be produced later. Both the pseudostem and the scape are often covered with reddish brown to dark violet spots. The bracts under the umbel soon wither.

The umbel of flowers is more-or-less globe shaped, with from 10 to 200 individual flowers. The tepals, filaments of the stamens and the style are all scarlet, fading to pink.

Differences between the three accepted subspecies have been summarized by Friis and Nordal, and are shown in the table below.

It can be seen that although the dimensions mostly overlap, the length of the flower tube relative to the free segments at the end of the flower distinguishes S. m. subsp. longitubus, in which they are more-or-less the same length, from S. m. subsp. multiflorus, in which the tube is generally shorter than the free segments. S. m. subsp. katherinae is intermediate. S. m. subsp. multiflorus tends to have narrower free segments than the other two subspecies. S. m. subsp. katherinae is tall, S. m. subsp. longitubus short, with S. m. subsp. multiflorus generally intermediate, although varying in height throughout its considerable range.

Taxonomy

Scadoxus multiflorus was originally described by English botanist Thomas Martyn in 1795 as Haemanthus multiflorus. Constantine Samuel Rafinesque moved Haemanthus multiflorus to his new genus Scadoxus in 1838, giving it its current binomial name Scadoxus multiflorus. The separation of Scadoxus from Haemanthus was ignored by most workers until 1976, when the two genera were again segregated by Ib Friis and Inger Nordal. Haemanthus species are southern in distribution, form true bulbs and have 2n = 16 chromosomes, whereas Scadoxus species, such as S. multiflorus, are found throughout tropical Africa, do not all form bulbs and have 2n = 18 chromosomes. The leaves are a further distinguishing characteristic: those of Scadoxus are thinner and have a distinct stalk (petiole); those of Haemanthus are thicker and without a petiole.

Subspecies
Three subspecies are known:
S. multiflorus ssp. katharinae (Baker) Friis & Nordal – Swaziland and eastern South Africa
Synonyms: Haemanthus katharinae Baker, Haemanthus multiflorus subsp. katharinae (Baker) I.Bjørnstad & Friis
S. multiflorus ssp. longitubus (C.H.Wright) Friis & Nordal – west Africa
Synonyms: Haemanthus longitubus C.H.Wright, Haemanthus multiflorus subsp. longitubus (C.H.Wright) I.Bjørnstad & Friis, Haemanthus mannii Baker
S. multiflorus ssp. multiflorus – tropical and southern Africa, the Arabian Peninsula

Distribution and habitat

The species is native to tropical and southern Africa and parts of the Arabian Peninsula. Only the subspecies S. m. subsp. multiflorus occurs throughout this range. it is primarily a plant of moist, shady habitats. S. m. subsp. longitubus is found only in tropical West and Central Africa, in moist lowland forest in Ghana, Ivory Coast, Liberia and Sierra Leone as well as in Cameroon. S. m. subsp. katherinae is native to Mediterranean climate forest, scrub and woodland in eastern southern Africa – Cape Province and KwaZulu-Natal in South Africa and Swaziland.Called 'May masa poovu' meaning May flower in malayalam as it blooms in the month of May, it can also be found in southern parts of India, especially Kerala.

Cultivation

 or more for those of tropical origin. An open, well-drained growing medium, largely organic in nature, is recommended. Propagation is by seed. Pests are those of Scadoxus generally.

Scadoxus multiflorus subsp. longitubus is rarely if ever cultivated, although (under the synonym Haemanthus mannii) it was described as having been "introduced" in 1877. Scadoxus multiflorus subsp. multiflorus is produced for sale in large numbers by the Dutch horticultural industry. In cultivated forms, the flowers often appear before the leaves, sometimes not until late summer.

Red berries may be produced, which can last through the winter. The UK National Plant Collection for Scadoxus has described it as "an excellent plant for a glasshouse or sunny windowsill." In South Africa it can be grown in the open garden in the shade, in well-drained, light soil containing plenty of organic matter. It requires ample water when in growth but must have good drainage when dormant. It will grow under trees provided the soil is sufficiently fertile.

Cultivars
Some artificial hybrids between S. multiflorus subsp. katherinae and S. puniceus are known. Johannes Nicolai raised S. 'König Albert' which flowered for the first time in 1899. Although rare in cultivation, it multiplies rapidly. Of the same parentage is S. 'Andromeda', raised by C. G. van Tubergen around 1904.

Scadoxus multiflorus subsp. katherinae has received the Royal Horticultural Society's Award of Garden Merit.

Toxicity and uses

The genus Scadoxus has some strongly toxic species, containing poisonous alkaloids lethal to animals, such as sheep and goats, that graze on the leaves or bulbs. Scadoxus multiflorus is traditionally used in parts of tropical Africa as a component of arrow poisons and fishing poisons. It is also used in traditional medicine, although in South Africa less so than Scadoxus puniceus.

References

External links

Amaryllidoideae
Flora of Africa
Flora of Saudi Arabia
Flora of Mexico
Flora of Oman
Flora of Yemen
Flora of Seychelles
Chagos Archipelago
Plants described in 1795